Hatch Lake is a lake in Rice County, in the U.S. state of Minnesota.

Hatch Lake was named for Zenas Y. Hatch, an early settler.

References

Lakes of Minnesota
Lakes of Rice County, Minnesota